Amanda Crawford may refer to:

 Amanda Crawford (footballer) (born 1971), association football player for New Zealand 
 Amanda Crawford (sprinter) (born 1999), American born, Grenadian sprinter